Sherrard may refer to:

Sherrard (name)
Sherrard, Illinois
Sherrard, West Virginia, an unincorporated community in Marshall County, West Virginia
Sherrard Island (Queensland)

See also
Sherrard Falls, a waterfall of New South Wales, Australia
Sherard (disambiguation)